Aljoscha Lartey Hyde (born 30 April 1992) is a German-Ghanaian footballer who plays as a defender for Oberliga Niedersachsen club SV Ramlingen-Ehlershausen.

Career
Hyde made his professional debut for Werder Bremen II in the 3. Liga on 21 January 2012, starting the match against Rot-Weiß Erfurt which finished as a 1–1 home draw.

In he left Hannoverscher SC to join SC Hemmingen-Westerfeld.

References

External links
 
 
 Hannoverscher SC 2015–16 statistics
 Hannoverscher SC 2017–18 statistics
 SC Hemmingen-Westerfeld statistics

1992 births
People from Hanover Region
Footballers from Lower Saxony
German sportspeople of Ghanaian descent
Living people
German footballers
Association football defenders
SV Werder Bremen II players
SC Wiedenbrück 2000 players
SV Wilhelmshaven players
Hannoverscher SC players
3. Liga players
Regionalliga players
Oberliga (football) players